Liu Xirong (born 1 November 1969) is a Chinese rower. She competed at the 1992 Summer Olympics and the 1996 Summer Olympics.

References

1969 births
Living people
Chinese female rowers
Olympic rowers of China
Rowers at the 1992 Summer Olympics
Rowers at the 1996 Summer Olympics
Place of birth missing (living people)
Asian Games medalists in rowing
Rowers at the 1990 Asian Games
Rowers at the 1994 Asian Games
Asian Games gold medalists for China
Medalists at the 1990 Asian Games
Medalists at the 1994 Asian Games
World Rowing Championships medalists for China
20th-century Chinese women
21st-century Chinese women